The Merry Widow is a 1925 American silent romantic drama/black comedy film directed and written by Erich von Stroheim. Released by Metro-Goldwyn-Mayer, the film stars Mae Murray, John Gilbert, Roy D'Arcy, and Tully Marshall, with pre-fame uncredited appearances by Joan Crawford and Clark Gable.

The film is based on the Franz Lehár's 1905 operetta of the same name, and was its second film adaptation, the first being a 1918 Hungarian film directed by Michael Curtiz.

A print of the film still survives, and the end sequence shot in two-tone Technicolor is available online.

Plot
As described in a film magazine reviews, Prince Danilo meets Sally the dancer and, when he proposes marriage, his uncle, King Nikita I of Monteblanco and Queen Milena object because she is a commoner. Sally marries Baron Sadoja, an old wealthy roue who later dies from a stroke. Prince Danilo’s parents now encourage the marriage. A slurring remark is the cause of a duel between the cousins and Danilo is wounded, sacrificing his cousin whom he believes Sally loves. Crown Prince Mirko is assassinated and Danilo becomes heir to the throne. Sally visits Danilo at the hospital and asks him to marry her.

Cast
 Mae Murray as Sally O'Hara 
 John Gilbert as Prince Danilo Petrovich 
 Roy D'Arcy as Crown Prince Mirko 
 Josephine Crowell as Queen Milena 
 George Fawcett as King Nikita I 
 Tully Marshall as Baron Sixtus Sadoja 
 Edward Connelly as Baron Popoff (ambassador)

Uncredited
Selected cast that were uncredited:
 Helen Howard Beaumont as Chorus girl
 Gertrude Bennett as Hard-Boiled Virginia 
 Bernard Berger as Boy 
 Sidney Bracey as Danilo's footman 
 Estelle Clark as French barber 
 Albert Conti as Danilo's adjutant 
 D'Arcy Corrigan as Horatio 
 Joan Crawford as Extra
 Xavier Cugat as Orchestra leader 
 Anielka Elter as Blindfolded musician
 Dale Fuller as Sadoja's chambermaid
 Clark Gable as Ballroom dancing extra
 Edna Tichenor as Dopey Marie
 Zalla Zarana as Frenchie Christine
 Edna Simms as Ballroom dancing extra

Production

The film was shot over twelve weeks with a budget of $592,000. Filming was tense as Mae Murray and the film's director, Erich von Stroheim, did not get on well. After production, Metro-Goldwyn-Mayer decided it could no longer work with the director after he added sexually explicit scenes and changed the operetta's libretto.

Reception
Upon its release, the film was both a critical and box office success. Critics praised Murray's dramatic skills while also noting that von Stroheim had "made an actress out of Miss Murray". According to MGM records The Merry Widow took in approximately $1.081 million in theater rentals from the United States and Canada, an additional $852,000 from foreign rentals, and earned a profit of $758,000.

Other adaptations
The Merry Widow was adapted for the screen in 1934, 1952, 1962, and 1994.

See also
 List of early color feature films

References

External links

 
 
 
 
 Fritzi Kramer, The Merry Widow, a Silent Review at moviessilently.com, with stills

1925 films
1925 romantic drama films
1920s color films
American romantic drama films
American silent feature films
American black-and-white films
Metro-Goldwyn-Mayer films
Films based on operettas
Films directed by Erich von Stroheim
Films produced by Irving Thalberg
Silent films in color
Films set in the 1900s
Films set in Europe
Films with screenplays by Benjamin Glazer
1920s American films
Silent romantic drama films
Silent American drama films